The 1992 NCAA Women's Golf Championships were contested at the 11th annual NCAA-sanctioned golf tournament to determine the individual and team national champions of women's collegiate golf in the United States. Until 1996, the NCAA would hold just one annual women's golf championship for all programs across Division I, Division II, and Division III.

The tournament was held at the Karsten Golf Course in Tempe, Arizona.

San Jose State won the team championship, the Spartans' third win.

Vicki Goetze, of Georgia, won the individual title.

Individual results

Individual champion
 Vicki Goetze, Georgia (280, −8)

Team leaderboard

 DC = Defending champion
 Debut appearance

References

NCAA Women's Golf Championship
Golf in Arizona
NCAA Women's Golf Championship
NCAA Women's Golf Championship
NCAA Women's Golf Championship